Lisa Moser may refer to:

 Lisa-Maria Moser (born 1991), Austrian tennis player
 Lisa Moser (politician), American businesswoman and member of the Kansas House of Representatives